Mario Gully – also known professionally as O.M.G. – is an American comic book artist, who created the comic book series Ant. Ant was first picked up by Arcana Studios[1] and later moved to Image Comics where it would deal with more adult themes, leading to an incident where Gully had to issue an apology for a partial nude scene.[2] The comic book would move again to Big City Comics[3] where three further issues were published. Mario Gully later moved from the Independent pool of comics to go on and draw for Marvel Comics. Collaboration with several artists, including Matt Nixon, J.Scott Campbell, Joe Benitez, Roy Thomas, and Thomas Riviere, Mario Gully worked as an illustrator. He also has drawn Marvel Illustrated: Treasure Island adapted by legendary writer Roy Thomas with whom he would also work on the adaptation of Kidnapped,[4] Marvel Adventures Hulk, and Exiles

Work

Ant 
Ant is an comic book series that is created by Mario Gully. Ant is the story about a girl who understands adult world faster than other kids. When she gets bullied by her schoolmates, she decides to create an imaginary world on drawing paper and create a super hero, the Ant. According to Gully,

After the prison, he studied by himself and worked with Matt Nixon for Ant comic series. Gully's art style is influenced by Greg Capullo who worked on Batman series.

Mario Gully successfully published and sold the first Ant with J.Scott Campbell, Joe Benitez and Matt Nixon who wrote Wolverine. After the success, Ant was moved into Image Comics, a comic book publisher company. Ant became more popular while Mario Gully was improving his art skill and became better writer and artist.

Mario Gully had a problem with inappropriate contents in issue #8 of Ant. In the issue #8, it contains profanity and nudity that made people to upset. Mario Gully responded that he was trying to introduce rough characters, but he went farther than he expected to be. Because of that, he decided to go through the issues and edit some of the problems. Also, Gully would make sure that the problem would not happen again in the future.

While he was in Image Comics, the company announced that Ant had been cancelled because of the mutual painting style. Mario had no choice but moving to another publisher, Big City Comics. After the moving, he published Ant new series, Ant:Unleashed and work on Marvel's projects.

In 2012, Mario sold his character Ant to Savage Dragon creator and Image comics founder Erik Larsen. Mario's final Ant cover appeared on a variant cover for Ant #12, which was published on June 9, 2021.

Kidnapped 
Mario Gully teamed up with Roy Thomas, a writer and a former Marvel Editor-in-chief, and published a new comic book called Kidnapped. Kidnapped is a 19th-century adventure novel that Thomas brought it into a comic book series. Kidnapped is about the sixteen year old young adult who got forced to join a ship by an uncle and go through adventure. Thomas and Gully aimed at an all age adventure story. Gully had to adapt his art style to classical art style and he successfully made old looking illustration. Thomas said he would like to reteam up with Gully again for another project.

Treasure Island 
Treasure Island is a comic book that Gully worked on as an illustrator. "Contains material originally published in magazine form as Marvel Illustrated: Treasure Island, $1-6 Fifteen men on the dead man's chest-- yo-ho-ho and a bottle of rum!' With this sinister snatch of piratical song echoing along the English coast, the mysterious Billy Bones ushers young Jim Hawkins into an undreamed-of world of danger and adventure on the far-flung, mist-shrouded Treasure Island. And over it all looms the towering shadow of the most famous corsair of them all-- the ever-scheming, intriguing, and enigmatic Long John Silver' -- from dust jacket back"

 Dirty Bones 
Mario Gully launched new comic book series on Kickstarter, a crowdfunding site. The new comic book, Dirty Bones, was written and illustrated by Gully and colored by Thomas Mason. The story is about a dog who caught up a world organized crime and forbidden love. Gully's crowdfund goal had aimed at $50,000. He said "This is my first big project since I created Ant." However, the funding was failed with $17,532 and 145 backers.

 Mario Gully's first sketchbook 
Mario Gully's project, Original Mario Gully's very first Sketchbook, had successfully crowdfunded on Indiegogo, a crowdfunding site. Gully, his agent, and Thomas Riviere launched this project after many requests from people. The crowdfunding project includes commissions and signed prints. Gully said he is very exciting since this is his first book that contains his sketch drawings. For this funding goal, he aimed at $3,000 and it was successful with $5,002 and 152 backers.

Bibliography
Comics work includes:Ant #1-4 (script and art, Arcana Studios, May–October 2004)Ant #1-7 (script and art, Image Comics, August 2005 - June 2006, tpb Ant: Reality Bites collects Ant #1-4, 120 pages, April 2006)Ant Unleashed #1-6 (script and art, Big City Comics, December 2007 - May 2008)Totem #1-7 (pencils, with writer Jeff Kaufman, Big City Comics, 2007–2008)Marvel Illustrated: Treasure Island (pencils, with writer Roy Thomas, 6-issue limited series, Marvel Comics, August 2007 - January 2008)Marvel Adventures: Hulk #6 (pencils, with writer Paul Benjamin, Marvel Comics, February 2008)
 "World Tour" (pencils, with Mike Raicht, in Exiles: Days of Then and Now, Marvel Comics, March 2008)Marvel Illustrated: Kidnapped (pencils, with writer Roy Thomas, 5-issue limited series, Marvel Comics, January–May 2009)Army of Darkness'' #24 (art, with writer Mike Raicht, Dynamite Entertainment, July 2009)
Heavy Metal Magazine #272 Heavy Metal (magazine) 2015
Creator and writer of Dirty Bones 2014- (current)
Kill Zone PS4 Concept art: Sony (Entertainment) 2015 
Rubio Arts Orlando apprenticeship under Jess Rubio Walt Disney World Jess Rubio, under Walt Disney

Notes

References

External links

Interviews
NEW-GEN Spotlight talks to Mario Gully

Super Hero Speak interview with Mario Gully

African-American artists
Year of birth missing (living people)
Living people
American comics artists
African-American comics creators
American comics creators
People from Orlando, Florida
Artists from Florida
21st-century African-American people